

Arthropods

Insects

Archosauromorphs
 Apatosaurus gastroliths documented.
 Wieland claims to have found stegosaur gastroliths.

Dinosaurs
Data courtesy of George Olshevsky's dinosaur genera list.

References

 
 Sanders F, Manley K, Carpenter K. Gastroliths from the Lower Cretaceous sauropod Cedarosaurus weiskopfae. In: Tanke D.H, Carpenter K, editors. Mesozoic vertebrate life: new research inspired by the paleontology of Philip J. Currie. Indiana University Press; Bloomington, IN: 2001. pp. 166–180.